Euphorbia rhombifolia is a species of flowering plant in the Euphorbiaceae family. It is native to Namibia and South Africa, where it is widespread in clay-rich soils, extending as far east as Kwazulu-Natal.

As most other succulent members of the genus Euphorbia, its trade is regulated under Appendix II of CITES.

Description

It grows to 60 or 70 cm in height, with a tuberous root-system that is often eaten by porcupines, and with thin (3-5mm), erect, grey, branching stems. 
The branches are dichotomous and taper to soft points.

The plants in the south-western Cape (E. caterviflora) are smaller, reaching only 30 cm in height.

The leaves are small (1-3mm), dark, triangular and deciduous. The flowerheads are also small (3mm) and appear from winter into spring.

Related species
This species is part of a group of closely related "stick euphorbias" including Euphorbia burmannii and Euphorbia tenax, which are widespread across southern Africa.

References

rhombifolia
rhombifolia
Flora of South Africa
Renosterveld
Taxa named by Pierre Edmond Boissier